The Nandi Award for Best Child Actor winners since 1981:

References

Child Actor